"Talking to Jesus" is a song performed by American contemporary worship bands Elevation Worship and Maverick City Music, which features vocals from Brandon Lake. The song was released on April 9, 2021, as a promotional single from their collaborative live album, Old Church Basement (2021). The song was written by Brandon Lake, Chris Brown, and Steven Furtick.

"Talking to Jesus" debuted at No. 9 on the US Hot Christian Songs chart, and at No. 1 on the Hot Gospel Songs chart.

Background
On April 9, 2021, Elevation Worship and Maverick City Music released "Talking to Jesus" featuring Brandon Lake as the second promotional single from their collaborative album, Old Church Basement (2021). "Talking to Jesus" is the follow-up to the first promotional single from the album, "Jireh". The song also marks Brandon Lake's second appearance on an Elevation Worship project, having co-written and featured on the hit single "Graves into Gardens".

Writing and development
Chris Brown of Elevation Worship shared the story about how the song came about, saying

Brown further added that he had difficulty explaining how they fell into a two chord trance that lasted several hours, with Furtick telling stories on the microphone, but that is how the song came about.

Composition

Commercial performance
"Talking to Jesus" debuted at No. 9 on the US Hot Christian Songs chart and at No. 1 on the Hot Gospel Songs chart, both dated April 22, 2021. "Talking to Jesus" attracted 2 million streams and 4,000 downloads in the United States in its first week. "Talking to Jesus" is the second Hot Gospel Songs chart-topper for Elevation Worship and Maverick City Music, while being Brandon Lake's first No. 1 entry on the chart. On Hot Christian Songs, it is the eighth top ten entry for Elevation Worship, and the second for Maverick City Music and Lake.

Music videos
On April 9, 2021, Elevation Worship released the official music video of "Talking to Jesus" on their YouTube channel. The video shows Brandon Lake leading the song.

On April 30, 2021, Elevation Worship published the lyric video of the song on YouTube.

Charts

Weekly charts

Year-end charts

Release history

References

External links
 

2021 songs
Elevation Worship songs
Maverick City Music songs
Brandon Lake songs
Songs written by Brandon Lake
Songs written by Steven Furtick